Persiaran Surian is a driveway (highway) in Petaling Jaya, Selangor, Malaysia. The driveway connects from Kota Damansara to Mutiara Damansara. This driveway is maintained by the Petaling Jaya City Council or Majlis Bandaraya Petaling Jaya (MBPJ) and Mutiara Rini Sdn Bhd. During weekends and public holidays, the driveway becomes a main popular route to Mutiara Damansara town centre such as The Curve, IPC Shopping Centre, IKEA and Cathay Cineleisure.

There is an elevated MRT Kajang line running through Persiaran Surian which are Kota Damansara, Surian and Mutiara Damansara.

List of junctions

See also 
Persiaran Kewajipan, similar road in UEP Subang Jaya (USJ) that has an evaluated Kelana Jaya line.

References 

Highways in Malaysia
Roads in Petaling Jaya